Harry Lambert (born 1987) is a British editorial and celebrity fashion stylist. He is best known for his work styling musician Harry Styles, actors Emma Corrin and Josh O'Connor and football player Dominic Calvert-Lewin.

Early life and education 
Harry Lambert grew up in Norwich, England, the son of a policeman and a nurse. His obsession with style and clothing was sparked by a VHS tape of Madonna music videos that his mother used to show him on repeat as a child. Lambert's father was also a very flamboyant dresser. As a teenager, the Topman in Norwich denied him a job because they felt he "wasn't cool enough." He eventually became employed at the River Island Topman, and his earliest work as a stylist was decorating the mannequins there. He also dressed mannequins at his local charity shop. Lambert studied photography at the University for the Creative Arts in Kent. At the university, Lambert learned what a fashion stylist was for the first time.

In the summers while he was at university, Lambert was an intern for fashion magazines. As an intern at Vogue, he had the opportunity to work on shoots with photographers Tim Walker and Nick Knight, as well as fashion designer Lucinda Chambers and Cheryl Cole.

Career

Early career
Lambert worked for a senior menswear stylist in London for two and a half years. Following this, he worked as a freelance commercial stylist for Asos and Topman. Lambert also assisted with styling fashion shows at London Fashion Week for designers JW Anderson, James Long, and Xander Zhou. In 2013 he was a guest judge on Elite Model Look UK. He became committed to pursuing styling long-term after he bejeweled roller-skates for Little Boots to wear in a shoot for The Guardian.

As stylist to Harry Styles 
Styles met Lambert in 2014. At the time, Styles was a fan of Yves Saint Laurent, and emulating Mick Jagger's fashion. Lambert presented him with a wardrobe he described as "playful", that was inspired by Gucci and JW Anderson. At first, Styles felt that the flares he was presented with were "fucking crazy" but he loved that Lambert "had fun with clothing." 
Lambert has connected Styles with many small designers, lifting their names up to the mainstream in the process. In 2015 Styles wore clothing by Daniel W. Fletcher. Styles purchased every shirt in his graduate collection when Fletcher was only 24, and wore them on talk shows, causing the launch of his collection to sell out instantly. He wore Charles Jeffrey LOVERBOY on the Late Late Show with James Corden in 2017, and custom Harris Reed during Live on Tour in 2018. Lambert and Styles collaborated with Reed on outfits for Styles' "Lights Up" music video and the December 2020 profile of Vogue. Similar to Fletcher, Reed was in the process of graduating from Central Saint Martins when he was commissioned. Styles wore clothes created by the designer Steven Stokey-Daley in his "Golden" music video, as well as items by designers Emily Bode, Arturo Obegero, and Lazoschmidl, among others. 
Styles collaborated with Lambert on his Met Gala outfit and for his Vogue photoshoot, where he wore a Gucci dress on the cover.

As stylist to Emma Corrin, Josh O'Connor and Dominic Calvert-Lewin
Lambert worked with Corrin and O'Connor on red carpet attire for The Crown, but they were forced to deliver looks digitally instead of for talk shows, premieres, and awards due to the COVID-19 pandemic. He also worked with O'Connor for the 2021 Cannes Film Festival, where he wore a custom Loewe look. Lambert styled Corrin for the 2022 Laurence Olivier Awards, where they wore a Loewe dress, and for the 2022 Met Gala, where they paid homage to Evander Berry Wall.

In 2021 Lambert started working with football player Dominic Calvert-Lewin. Their first work together was for Highsnobiety. Later that year, Lambert styled Calvert-Lewin for the cover of Arena Homme +, where he wore a flared short suit and a glittery pink Prada handbag. In 2022 Lambert worked with Calvert-Lewin on a British GQ editorial.

Other work
Lambert has also styled Barry Keoghan and Alexander Skarsgård. Brands he has worked with include Harvey Nichols, Paul & Joe, Jo Malone London and Gucci. He styled campaigns for designers S.S. DALEY and Harris Reed.

Impact
Lambert's work has sparked debate about gender norms in fashion.However, he claims that debate is not his intent, saying that commentary on gender is simply "a byproduct of what we’re doing [. . .] I'm aware that what I do is having an impact, but is that top of the agenda for me? No.” He says that he hopes when he is gone that people remember him for "silly things such as putting Harry [Styles] in pearls" and "when people dress up as Harry for Halloween" because "It means that we’ve done something that has had cultural impact. It means we got through."

Personal life
Lambert has lived in east London since 2009. He lives with his partner Antonio.

References 

Harry Styles
1987 births
Living people